War Memorial Gymnasium is a 2,500-seat multi-purpose indoor arena in the northwest United States, on the campus of the University of Idaho in Moscow, Idaho.  Opened  in November 1928, the venue honors state residents who gave their lives in the service of their country in World War I.

The architectural style is Tudor-Gothic and is heavily buttressed; the chief architect was David C. Lange, the head of the university's architecture department.

Its predecessor was the original gymnasium (and armory), located directly east; constructed in 1904; it has been reconfigured and continues on campus as the "Art and Architecture South"  During its time as the varsity basketball venue, it was also a library, with bookshelves along  After the Memorial Gym opened, it became the women's gym.

Memorial Gymnasium was the primary home of Vandal basketball until  replaced by the newly-enclosed  the Dome's basketball configuration was renamed "Cowan Spectrum" in early 2001. Future hall of famer Gus Johnson played for the Vandals during the 1962–63 season, and the "Mem Gym" was frequently sold out, with the attendance estimated   1940s and early 1950s, Idaho had a nationally prominent boxing team; over five thousand attended a dual meet against Palouse neighbor Washington State  It was dropped by the university as an intercollegiate sport in 1954, and discontinued by the NCAA after 1960.

The Memorial Gym is the current home court of Vandal women's volleyball, with a portable Taraflex court since 1999.  hosts early season basketball games on the hardwood, depending upon the late season football schedule, and the facility is used extensively for physical education classes, intramurals, and open recreation.

While the 2020–21 school year was initially expected to be the last for Mem Gym as a varsity athletics venue, following the 2021 completion of the 4,200-seat Idaho Central Credit Union Arena (ICCU Arena), that plan changed. ICCU Arena became the new home of Vandals men's and women's basketball, but volleyball remained in Mem Gym.

At just 49 years of age, it was added to the National Register of Historic Places in 1977. The narrow swimming pool in the basement of the Mem Gym was retired in 1970, when the new swim center opened. The Kibbie Dome lacked locker rooms for its first seven years, so the Vandals and visiting teams continued to dress in the Memorial Gym. The completion of the East End Addition in the fall of 1982 ended the long trek, frequently in rain or snow during basketball season.

See also
 National Register of Historic Places listings in Latah County, Idaho
 List of NCAA Division I basketball arenas

References

External links
 Go Vandals.com - Facilities: Memorial Gymnasium
 University of Idaho - University Support Services: Memorial Gymnasium
University of Idaho Library - photos - Memorial Gymnasium
 Photo of Memorial Gymnasium - north side exterior - c. 1930s
 Photo of Memorial Gymnasium - from northeast - c. 1950s - (Neale Stadium in background)
 Vandal Boxing - 1949 - 4,200 in Mem Gym
 Gem of the Mountains, 1929 – original indoor view, from SE corner

Indoor arenas in Idaho
College basketball venues in the United States
Sports venues in Idaho
School buildings completed in 1928
University of Idaho buildings and structures
Idaho Vandals men's basketball
University and college buildings on the National Register of Historic Places in Idaho
Monuments and memorials in Idaho
World War I memorials in the United States
1928 establishments in Idaho
College volleyball venues in the United States
Tourist attractions in Latah County, Idaho
National Register of Historic Places in Latah County, Idaho
Event venues on the National Register of Historic Places in Idaho
Sports venues on the National Register of Historic Places in Idaho
Sports venues completed in 1928